Franciscus Irenicus, byname of Franz Friedlieb (1494/1495 – 1553) was a German humanist, Protestant reformer and historian.

He was born in Ettlingen and died in Gemmingen. He studied at the famous Latin school in Pforzheim, where Philipp Melanchthon was a fellow student in 1508-09. As a patriotic humanist he describes Germany in twelve books: , which appeared in Hagenau in 1518.

References

Melanchthon, Philipp, Corpus Reformatorum, eds. K. Bretschneider and H. Bindseil, 28 vols (Halle: Schwetschke, 1834–60).

External links
 Ortelius Bibliography

1490s births
1553 deaths
Year of birth uncertain

German Renaissance humanists
16th-century German historians
People from the Margraviate of Baden
German male non-fiction writers